Tanks Peak, elevation , is a summit in the Uinta Range located northeast of Dinosaur in Moffat County, Colorado .

Historical names
Tank Peak
Tanks Peak

See also

List of Colorado mountain ranges
List of Colorado mountain summits
List of Colorado fourteeners
List of Colorado 4000 meter prominent summits
List of the most prominent summits of Colorado
List of Colorado county high points

References

External links

Mountains of Colorado
Mountains of Moffat County, Colorado
North American 2000 m summits